The 2019 NCAA Division I men's basketball tournament was a single-elimination tournament of 68 teams to determine the National Collegiate Athletic Association (NCAA) Division I men's college basketball national champion for the 2018–19 season. The 81st annual edition of the tournament began on March 19, 2019, and concluded with the championship game on April 8 at U.S. Bank Stadium in Minneapolis, Minnesota, between the Texas Tech Red Raiders and the Virginia Cavaliers, with Virginia winning 85–77 in overtime.

Two schools made their first appearances in the tournament: Big South champion Gardner–Webb and Southland champion Abilene Christian.

For the first time since 2001, no #8 seed survived the first round of the tournament. This was also the first time since the First Four was established in 2011 that no team in the First Four advanced past the first round of the tournament. 

This tournament marked the first time that the Auburn Tigers of the Southeastern Conference and the Texas Tech Red Raiders of the Big 12 Conference made the Final Four. This also marked the third Final Four appearance for the Virginia Cavaliers of the Atlantic Coast Conference, but their first since 1984.

The 2019 tournament was the first since 1979 to see two first-time Final Four participants, and the first since 2006 to have a first-time national champion. As a result of a worldwide COVID-19 pandemic that started in late 2019 and subsequently forced the cancellation of the 2020 tournament, this would be the last tournament held until 2021, and this would be also the last tournament held across the United States until 2022.

Carsen Edwards of Purdue was the leading scorer, with 139 points in only 4 games–producing an average of 34.8 points per game. Edwards also set the record for most made 3-point shots in a tournament, with 28. The previous record holder, Glen Rice of Michigan in 1989, made 27, but did so in 6 games. 

In the previous year's tournament, Virginia had infamously become the first No. 1 seed to lose to a No. 16 seed. At the conclusion of this year's title game, CBS announcer Jim Nantz dubbed Virginia's win the "all-time turnaround title."

Tournament procedure

	
A total of 68 teams entered the 2019 tournament. 32 automatic bids were awarded to each program that won their conference's tournament. The remaining 36 bids were "at-large", with selections extended by the NCAA Selection Committee.

Eight teams (the four lowest-seeded automatic qualifiers and the four lowest-seeded at-large teams) played in the First Four (the successor to what had been popularly known as "play-in games" through the 2010 tournament). The winners of these games advanced to the main draw of the tournament.

The Selection Committee seeded the entire field from 1 to 68.

The selections and seedings were completed and revealed on Sunday, March 17.

Schedule and venues

The following are the sites that were selected to host each round of the 2019 tournament:

First Four
March 19 and 20
University of Dayton Arena, Dayton, Ohio (Host: University of Dayton)

First and Second Rounds (Subregionals)
March 21 and 23
East and West Region
 XL Center, Hartford, Connecticut (Host: University of Connecticut)
 Wells Fargo Arena, Des Moines, Iowa (Host: Drake University)
 VyStar Veterans Memorial Arena, Jacksonville, Florida (Host: Jacksonville University)
 Vivint Smart Home Arena, Salt Lake City, Utah (Host: University of Utah)
March 22 and 24
South and Midwest Region
 Colonial Life Arena, Columbia, South Carolina (Host: University of South Carolina)
 Nationwide Arena, Columbus, Ohio (Host: Ohio State University)
 BOK Center, Tulsa, Oklahoma (Host: University of Tulsa)
 SAP Center, San Jose, California (Host: West Coast Conference)

Regional semifinals and finals (Sweet Sixteen and Elite Eight)
March 28 and 30
West Regional, Honda Center, Anaheim, California (Host: Big West Conference)
South Regional, KFC Yum! Center, Louisville, Kentucky (Host: University of Louisville)
March 29 and 31
East Regional, Capital One Arena, Washington, D.C. (Host: Georgetown University)
Midwest Regional, Sprint Center, Kansas City, Missouri (Host: Missouri Valley Conference)

National semifinals and championship (Final Four and championship)
April 6 and 8
U.S. Bank Stadium, Minneapolis, Minnesota (Host: University of Minnesota)

U.S. Bank Stadium became the 40th venue to host the Final Four. This was the first hosting of the event at the facility, built on the former site of the Hubert H. Humphrey Metrodome, a two-time host in 1992 and 2001. The tournament returned to Hartford's XL Center for the first time since 1998. For the first time since 1970, the tournament returned to Columbia, South Carolina, with games played at the Colonial Life Arena.

Qualification and selection

Four teams, out of 353 in Division I, were ineligible to participate in the 2019 tournament; Alabama A&M and  Florida A&M failed to meet APR requirements, while California Baptist and North Alabama are amidst reclassification from Division II.

Automatic qualifiers

Tournament seeds

The tournament seeds and regions were determined through the NCAA basketball tournament selection process.

*See First Four

Tournament bracket
* – Denotes overtime period

First Four – Dayton, OH
The First Four games involved eight teams: the four overall lowest-ranked teams, and the four lowest-ranked at-large teams.

East Regional – Washington, DC

East Regional Final

East Regional all tournament team
Cassius Winston, Michigan State 
Xavier Tillman, Michigan State
Zion Williamson, Duke
RJ Barrett, Duke
Kerry Blackshear Jr., Virginia Tech

West Regional – Anaheim, CA

West Regional Final

West Regional all tournament team
Jarrett Culver, Texas Tech 
Matt Mooney, Texas Tech
Rui Hachimura, Gonzaga
Brandon Clarke, Gonzaga
Trent Forrest, Florida State

South Regional – Louisville, KY

South Regional Final

South Regional all tournament team
Carsen Edwards, Purdue 
Kyle Guy, Virginia
Mamadi Diakite, Virginia
Ty Jerome, Virginia
Ryan Cline, Purdue

Midwest Regional – Kansas City, MO

Midwest Regional Final

Midwest Regional all tournament team
Jared Harper, Auburn 
Bryce Brown, Auburn
Chuma Okeke, Auburn
P. J. Washington, Kentucky
Tyler Herro, Kentucky

Final Four – Minneapolis, MN

* – Denotes overtime game

National semifinals

National Championship

Final Four all-tournament team
 Kyle Guy (Jr, Virginia) – Final Four Most Outstanding Player
 Jarrett Culver (So, Texas Tech) 
 Matt Mooney (Gr, Texas Tech)
 De'Andre Hunter (So, Virginia)
 Ty Jerome (Jr, Virginia)

Game summaries and tournament notes

Upsets
Per the NCAA, "Upsets are defined as when the winner of the game was seeded five or more places lower than the team it defeated." There were 5 upsets during the whole tournament, and all of them were in the first round.

Record by conference

The R64, R32, S16, E8, F4, CG, and NC columns indicate how many teams from each conference were in the round of 64 (first round), round of 32 (second round), Sweet 16, Elite Eight, Final Four, championship game, and national champion, respectively.
The "Record" column includes wins in the First Four for the NEC, Ohio Valley, Pac-12, and Summit conferences and losses in the First Four for the American and Big East conference.
The SWAC and MEAC each had one representative, eliminated in the First Four with a record of 0–1.
The America East, Big Sky, Big South, Colonial, C-USA, Horizon, MAAC, Missouri Valley, Patriot, Southland, Sun Belt, WAC, and Ivy League each had one representative, eliminated in the Round of 64 with a record of 0–1.

Media coverage

Television
CBS Sports and Turner Sports (via TBS, TNT, and truTV) had U.S. television rights to the tournament. As part of a cycle than began in 2016, CBS televised the 2019 Final Four and championship game.

In response to criticism over TBS's handling of the selection show in 2018 (which featured an unconventional two-hour format where all the qualifying teams were first revealed in alphabetical order before the matchups were actually unveiled, and had viewership fall by 52% partly due to it also being aired on cable rather than CBS), it was announced that CBS's selection show would revert to an hour-long format, and prioritize unveiling the bracket. CNN president Jeff Zucker, who had also become head of WarnerMedia's sports properties after a reorganization, explained that "it's a sign of understanding when things don't necessarily go as well as you would hope you change it. So there's no shame in that. At the end of the day, you have to give the fans what they want." The show attracted its highest viewership since 2014 and averaged a 4.0 share on Nielsen overnight ratings.

Television channels
First Four – truTV
First and Second rounds – CBS, TBS, TNT, and truTV
Regional semifinals and finals (Sweet Sixteen and Elite Eight) – CBS and TBS
National semifinals (Final Four) and championship – CBS

Studio hosts
 Greg Gumbel (New York City and Minneapolis) – First round, second round, Regionals, Final Four and National Championship Game
 Ernie Johnson (New York City, Atlanta, and Minneapolis) – First round, second round, Regional Semi-Finals, Final Four and National Championship Game
 Casey Stern (Atlanta) – First Four, first round and Second Round

Studio analysts
 Charles Barkley (New York City and Minneapolis) – First round, second round, Regionals, Final Four and National Championship Game
 Mike Brey (Atlanta) – Regional Semi-Finals
 Jeff Capel (Atlanta) – First round
 Seth Davis (Atlanta and Minneapolis) – First Four, first round, second round, Regional Semi-Finals, Final Four and National Championship Game
 Brendan Haywood (Atlanta) – First Four, first round, second round and Regional Semi-Finals
 Clark Kellogg (New York City and Minneapolis) – First round, second round, Regionals, Final Four and National Championship Game
 Porter Moser (Atlanta) – Second Round
 Candace Parker (Atlanta and Minneapolis) – First Four, first round, second round, Regional Semi-Finals and Final Four
 Kenny Smith (New York City and Minneapolis) – First round, second round, Regionals, Final Four and National Championship Game
 Gene Steratore (New York City and Minneapolis) (Rules Analyst) – First Four, first round, second round, Regionals, Final Four and National Championship Game
 Wally Szczerbiak (New York City and Minneapolis) – Second Round and Final Four
 Jay Wright (Minneapolis) – Final Four

Commentary teams
 Jim Nantz/Bill Raftery/Grant Hill/Tracy Wolfson – First and Second Rounds at Columbia, South Carolina; East Regional at Washington, D.C.; Final Four and National Championship at Minneapolis, Minnesota
 Brian Anderson/Chris Webber/Allie LaForce – First and Second Rounds at Columbus, Ohio; South Regional at Louisville, Kentucky
 Ian Eagle/Jim Spanarkel/Jamie Erdahl – First and Second Rounds at Jacksonville, Florida; Midwest Regional at Kansas City, Missouri
 Kevin Harlan/Reggie Miller/Dan Bonner/Dana Jacobson – First Four at Dayton, Ohio (Tuesday); First and Second Rounds at Des Moines, Iowa;  West Regional at Anaheim, California
 Brad Nessler/Steve Lavin/Jim Jackson/Evan Washburn – First and Second Rounds at Tulsa, Oklahoma
 Spero Dedes/Steve Smith/Len Elmore or Jim Jackson/Rosalyn Gold-Onwude – First Four at Dayton, Ohio (Wednesday); First and Second Rounds at San Jose, California
 Jackson called the First Four (Wednesday) with Elmore doing the First and Second Rounds with Dedes, Smith and Gold-Onwude.
 Andrew Catalon/Steve Lappas/Lisa Byington – First and Second Rounds at Salt Lake City, Utah
 Carter Blackburn/Debbie Antonelli/John Schriffen – First and Second Rounds at Hartford, Connecticut

ESPN International had international rights to the tournament. Coverage uses CBS/Turner play-by-play teams until the Final Four.

 Sean McDonough, Jay Bilas (Texas Tech vs. Michigan State), Dick Vitale (Virginia vs. Auburn, National Championship Game)

Radio
Westwood One had exclusive radio rights to the entire tournament.

First Four
Ted Emrich and Austin Croshere – at Dayton, Ohio

First and Second Rounds
Scott Graham and Donny Marshall – Hartford, Connecticut
Kevin Kugler and Robbie Hummel – Des Moines, Iowa
Tom McCarthy and Jon Crispin – Jacksonville, Florida
John Sadak and Dan Dickau – Salt Lake City, Utah
Brandon Gaudin and John Thompson – Columbia, South Carolina
Craig Way and Will Perdue – Columbus, Ohio
Ryan Radtke and P. J. Carlesimo – Tulsa, Oklahoma
Chris Carrino and Mike Montgomery – San Jose, California

Regionals
Kevin Kugler and John Thompson – East Regional at Washington, D.C.
Scott Graham and P. J. Carlesimo – Midwest Regional at Kansas City, Missouri
Brandon Gaudin and Will Perdue – South Regional at Louisville, Kentucky
Ryan Radtke and Jim Jackson – West Regional at Anaheim, California

Final Four
Kevin Kugler, John Thompson, Clark Kellogg, and Jim Gray – Minneapolis, Minnesota

Internet

Video
Live video of games was available for streaming through the following means:

 NCAA March Madness Live (website and app, no CBS games on digital media players; access to games on WarnerMedia channels (TBS, TNT, truTV) required TV Everywhere authentication through provider)
 CBS All Access (only CBS games, service subscription required)
 CBS Sports website and app (only CBS games)
 Watch TBS website and app (only TBS games, required TV Everywhere authentication)
 Watch TNT website and app (only TNT games, required TV Everywhere authentication)
 Watch truTV website and app (only truTV games, required TV Everywhere authentication)
 Websites and apps of cable, satellite, and OTT providers of CBS, TBS, TNT, and truTV (access required subscription)

In addition, the March Madness app offered Fast Break, whiparound coverage of games similar to NFL RedZone.
 Adam Lefkoe, Tony Delk, Steve Alford, Andy Katz - Atlanta

Audio
Live audio of games was available for streaming through the following means:
 NCAA March Madness Live (website and app)
 Westwood One Sports website
 TuneIn (website and app)
 Websites and apps of Westwood One Sports affiliates

Film 
Sixteen-Seed Gardner-Webb's season and appearance in the Tournament became the subject of a documentary titled The Dancin' Bulldogs released on October 16, 2020.

See also
 2019 NCAA Division II men's basketball tournament
 2019 NCAA Division III men's basketball tournament
 2019 NAIA Division I men's basketball tournament

Footnotes

References

Ncaa tournament
NCAA Division I men's basketball tournament
Basketball in Minnesota
NCAA Division I Men's Basketball
2010s in Minneapolis
NCAA Division I men's basketball tournament
NCAA Division I men's basketball tournament